Dimitrie Ghica or Ghika (31 May 1816 – 15 February 1897) was a Romanian politician. A prominent member of the Conservative Party, he served as Prime Minister between 1868 and 1870.

Dimitrie Ghica was born in the Ghica family, as the son of the Wallachian Prince Grigore IV Ghica by his first wife, Maria Hangerly. He married Charlotte Duport, and they had two daughters, Maria and Iza.

Dimitrie
Prime Ministers of Romania
Romanian Ministers of Foreign Affairs
Romanian Ministers of Interior
Romanian Ministers of Justice
Romanian Ministers of Public Works
Members of the Chamber of Deputies (Romania)
Presidents of the Chamber of Deputies (Romania)
Members of the Senate of Romania
Presidents of the Senate of Romania
Prime Ministers of the Principality of Wallachia
1816 births
1897 deaths